The 1887–88 international cricket season was from September 1887 to March 1888. The season consisted with a one-off Test tour by England in Australia.

Season overview

January

England in Australia

References

International cricket competitions by season
1887 in cricket
1888 in cricket